William Hazlitt (1778–1830) was an English writer.

William Hazlitt may also refer to:
 William Hazlitt (Unitarian minister) (1737–1820), Irish-born English minister
 William Hazlitt (registrar) (1811–1893), English lawyer and translator
 William Carew Hazlitt (1834–1913), English lawyer, editor and writer